Changsha Ecological Zoo is a zoo in Muyun, Changsha, Hunan, China.

It hosts over 300 animal species, and more than 5,000 animals.

History 

The Zoo has a history of 54 years while it was called Changsha Zoo until October 2010.

Changsha Zoo 
At the beginning of 1934, Changsha had a Zoo in Tianxin Park and reared more than 20 animals. In 1958, the Changsha Zoo was relocated to Martyrs Park and were officially listed. The park is a scenic, breeding and research area for wildlife in Hunan Province.

See also
 List of tourist attractions in China

References 

2010 establishments in China
Buildings and structures in Changsha
Tourist attractions in Changsha
Zoos in China